Christopher John Hawkesworth FRS FRSE (born 18 December 1947) is a British earth scientist, and former Deputy Principal and Vice-Principal for Research, at University of St Andrews.

Biography 
Hawkesworth was born in Khartoum, Sudan on 18 December 1947, and was brought up in Ireland. He graduated from Trinity College, Dublin in 1970, and Oxford University at St Edmund Hall in 1974. He received his DPhil at Oxford under the supervision of Professor Ron Oxburgh. 

He held positions at Open University and University of Bristol prior to holding the Wardlaw Chair of Earth Sciences and the position of Deputy Principal and Vice-Principal of Research at the University of St Andrews until 2014. 

He was awarded the Wollaston Medal in 2012. In 2012, he was elected a Fellow of the Royal Society of Edinburgh. In 2020, he was made a member of the Royal Irish Academy.

References

External links 

 "Work begins on St Andrews University research complex", The Courier

1947 births
Living people
British earth scientists
Fellows of the Royal Society
Alumni of Trinity College Dublin
Alumni of St Edmund Hall, Oxford
Academics of the University of Bristol
Academics of the University of St Andrews
Members of the Royal Irish Academy